Mary Louise Milliken Childs (1873-1936)  was a noted philanthropist in the 20th Century for building over twenty hospitals and two churches throughout the United States.  Her greatest accomplishments include the West Jersey Cooper Hospital in New Jersey and the Milliken Memorial Community House in Elkton, Kentucky.

American philanthropists
1873 births
1936 deaths